Ian Craig (23 October 1952 – 28 September 1982) was  a former Australian rules footballer who played with Richmond in the Victorian Football League (VFL).

Notes

External links 
		

1952 births
1982 deaths
Australian rules footballers from Victoria (Australia)
Richmond Football Club players